Haseena Moin (20 November 1941 – 26 March 2021) was a Pakistani dramatist, playwright and scriptwriter. She wrote several plays for stage, radio, and television. She was the recipient of the Pride of Performance award for her services to the performing arts in Pakistan. She wrote Pakistan's first original script Kiran Kahani aired in the early-1970s. Before this, PTV relied on novel-based scripts for dramas. She was considered to be the best playwright and dramatist Pakistan has ever witnessed.

Some of the dramas she wrote include Ankahi, Tanhaiyaan, Kiran Kahani, Dhoop Kinaray, Aahat, Uncle Urfi, Shehzori, Kohar, Des Pardes, Pal Do Pal, Aansoo, Kasak, Parchaiyan and Parosi. Other works include Mere Dard ko Jo Zuban Milay, Kaisa Yeh Junoon, Dhundle Raste, Shayad ke Bahar Aaye, Mohim Joo, Tum Se Mil Kar, Bandish and Zair, Zabar, Pesh.

Early life
Moin was born in Kanpur on November 20, 1941. She received her early education in her ancestral region and, after the independence of Pakistan in 1947, migrated with her family to Pakistan. She lived for a number of years in Rawalpindi, then moved to Lahore and, in the 1950s, settled in Karachi, where she graduated from the Government College for Women in 1960 and earned her Master of Arts in History from Karachi University in 1963. Her yearning for writing was visible right from the time she was in the final years of her schooling, as from 7th standard, beside other school activities she got selected to write a weekly column by the title of BHAI JAN for a local journal.

She wrote plays for Radio Pakistan Karachi's "Studio Number 9." Professionally, she took up the educational pursuits and started teaching. She rose to the level of Principal. It was in 1969 that Iftikhar Arif, Head of the Script Dept. at PTV-Karachi Centre, called Moin and offered her the chance to write a play for the then-forthcoming EID. Initially, Moin was nervous but took courage to pen down a play. The cast was also decided by her with Kunwar Aftab Ahmed as the director. Hence came Eid Ka Jorra with Neelofer Aleem and Talat Hussain in the lead, supported by Khalid Nizami and Ishrat Hashmi.

Career

Pakistan television
HMost of the plays of PTV like Shehzori, Zair, Zabar, Pesh, Uncle Urfi, Ankahi, Tanhaiyaan, Parchaieyen, Bandish, Dhund, Dhoop Kinarey, Aahat, Kasak, Pal Do Pal and Tere Ajane Se were written by her. Her play Gurya which was directed by Shirin Khan with cast members Manzoor Qureshi, Shahla Ahmad Bina of Uncle Urfi, Azra Sherwani and Raju Jamil, won an award at the Global TV Plays Festival in Tokyo for best script and direction. She was the writer of the first coloured drama of Pakistan, aired on PTV called Parchaiyan, which was directed by Mohsin Ali.

She also wrote Pakistan's first original script 'Kiran Kahani' aired in the early-1970s. Before this, PTV used to rely on novel-based scripts. Most of the people at that time were not confident with the experiment but it was Mohsin Ali who encouraged her to write it. It starred Roohi Bano in the lead with Manzoor Qureshi, Begum Khursheed Mirza, Qazi Wajid and many more.

Indian television
Her drama serial Dhoop Kinare aired in 1987. A loosely based remake of the series was later made in India by the name of Kuch Toh Log Kahenge and it aired from 2011 to 2013. It was re-written by popular Indian writer Kamlesh Pandey, who stated that by remaking this play he had paid tribute to Haseena Moin. Even Tanhaiyan was quite popular. These shows are still remembered amongst the Indian masses. She wrote a play for India called Tanha, which became widely popular during its run. She also wrote a play for Doordarshan called Kash-m-kash, Arshad Mahmood composed and Tina Sani sang the title song of the play.

Films

Lollywood
Moin wrote the script for the 1978 film Yahan Se Wahan Tak, starring Waheed Murad. The film was produced and directed by Syed Kamal. She also wrote the dialogues for the 1986 film Nazdekiyan which was directed by Usman Peerzada, starring Samina Peerzada and Usman Peerzada. The film was acclaimed and won prestigious national awards.

In 1998, Moin wrote Kahin Pyar Na Ho Jaye. The film was directed by Javed Sheikh and the cast included Resham, Shaan and Saleem Sheikh. Before release, the film was heavily hyped and was expected to be a success but eventually could not perform well at the box office.

Bollywood
Moin was the first Pakistani writer to write for a Bollywood film. Raj Kapoor wanted her to write the dialogues for his dream project Henna, which was released in 1991. He also wanted to cast Shehnaz Sheikh in the title role of the film but after she refused, Haseena Moin recommended Zeba Bakhtiar as the leading lady, thus Zeba was cast in the title role of Henna. The film was a box office success and was also chosen as India's entry for the Best Foreign Language Film at the Oscars.

Initially she was hesitant to write for a Bollywood film. During the pre-production stages Raj Kapoor died and the project was taken over by his son Randhir Kapoor. But when the film was about to be released, the Babri Mosque incident broke out and Moin wrote a letter to Randhir Kapoor in which she requested that her name should not be used to promote the film and neither should her name be mentioned in the credits as it may hurt her fans in Pakistan, thus her name was not mentioned in the credits nor was the film was promoted using her name but she was acknowledged at the end of the film. Although this incident brought a lot of loss to her, she stated in an interview that "she can do any thing for her country and sacrificing a film was very little thing for her she could also give her life for her country".

Genres
Moin wrote different types of drama. She has written comedies like Shehzori, Uncle Urfi, Tanhaiyaan with best comic characters in her plays, like Mamoo, Timmy and Moby in Ankahi; Qabacha, Bukrad and Aapa Begum in Tanhaiyan, Gazi Apa in Uncle Urfi to tragedies like Parchaiyaan. From romantic dramas like Dhoop Kinaray, Ankahi, Kohar to family dramas like Aansoo, she has also written several plays based on social issues like the super hit Aahat. It was based on family planning and was directed by Sahira Kazmi. Her play Des Pardes was based on the lives of people living in Scotland and the problems they have to face. Chup Darya, a telefilm starring Sania Saeed, was based on Karachi's conditions, and Shayad ke Bahar Aye was based on women's rights. She has also written historic plays like Tansen, Meray Dard ko jo Zuban Mile, and the recent Anjaane Nagar. Her other plays include Parosi, Pal do Pal, Kasak based on the life of a single parent, Dhundle Raaste and many more.

Recurring collaborators

Directors
Many of Moin's plays have been directed by Mohsin Ali. Starting from her first play Shehzori to Mohsin's last play Ik Naye Morr Pe, they had worked together in more than 10 plays. Other directors with whom Moin had repeatedly worked include Shoaib Mansoor (his debut play Ankahi and the long play Dhundle Raaste), Sahira Kazmi (she directed Haseena's two plays Dhoop Kinare and Aahat and she directed her first play Choti Choti Baatein which was also written by Moin. Sahira also acted in Haseena's Parchaiyan, M Zaheer Khan (he directed several episodes of Zer Zabar Pesh), he also directed Kohar, Aania and the remake of Kiran Kahani. Shirin Khan directed some early plays of Moin which include Uncle Urfi, Zer Zabar Pesh, Kiran Kahani and Gurya, Raana Sheikh (she directed Parosi, Shayad ke Bahar Aye and Kaisa Yeh Junoon), Ali Rizvi (he directed the Aansoo and Des Pardes as well as Meray Dard Ko Jo Zuban Mile).

Later work
Her drama serial Saare Mausam Apne Hain aired on Geo TV in late 2012. The drama was directed by Ali Rizvi. Meri Behan Maya, another play by Moin, also aired from 17 September 2012 to 11 January 2013 on Geo TV. It was directed by Azfer Ali. The play was well-received and Annie Jafry was appreciated for her performance as Maya.

In 2012, a sequel to one of her most popular drama serials, Tanhaiyaan was produced. Tanhaiyan Naye Silsilay aired from 20 October 2012 to 19 January 2013 on PTV and ARY Digital simultaneously. Moin wrote the first 7 episodes and then had to go abroad, so she allowed Mohammad Ahmed to write the rest of the episodes, with a plan to write the final episode when she returned. But by the time she returned, the entire serial was written and many changes were made to the episodes she had previously completed. She was disappointed and asked the producers to remove her name from the serial, but due to copyright issues her name could not be removed. Moin has said she had nothing to do with Naye Silsilay and was very disappointed by the outcome.

A serial titled Anjaane Nagar  started airing on TV ONE from May 2013. It was a period play set in 1939 and was shot at beautiful locations in Murree and the Northern Areas. It was directed by veteran director Khawaja Najam ul Hassan. It received critical acclaim upon its release.

An Eid telefilm titled Ooper Gori Ka Makaan aired from Express Entertainment in 2013. The telefilm was a romantic comedy and was directed by Yasir Nawaz. The cast included Neelam Munir and Junaid Khan in the lead roles.

Her serial Mohabbat Ho Gai Tumse, a story of four friends aired from TV ONE in August 2015. It was directed by the channel's chairperson Seema Taher Khan and starred Adnan Siddiqui, Deeba Naz, Zhalay Sarhadi, Azfer Rehman and Hira Tareen in lead roles.

Awards and achievements
Moin visited won the Pride of Performance Award in 1987 for her services to the performing arts in Pakistan. It is one of the highest civil awards conferred by the Pakistan Government. She had won many other awards including the Woman of the Year award. In 1975 she also won an award at the Global TV Plays Festival in Tokyo for best script and direction for her play Gurya. She had won accolades at nearly every year's Lux Style Awards as well as PTV Awards, during the late 1980s Moin Akhtar gave a tribute to her at a PTV awards ceremony. She had also appeared in many talk shows such as Anwar Maqsood's LG TV SHOW and Marina Mornings and many other numerous morning shows and chat shows. Most recently she appeared in The Big Show on CNBC alongside another legendary writer Fatima Surayya Bajia.

Politics and other work
With the increasing popularity of Imran Khan's political party Pakistan Tehreek-e-Insaaf many famous people including Haseena Moin had joined this political party.

Death  
Moin died on 26 March 2021 at the age of 79 in Karachi. She had been battling cancer for the past few years, however, the immediate cause of her death has not been revealed. She was last spotted in Karachi Arts Council on 22 Mar 2021 when she got her first Corona vaccine, just 4 days before her death. As mentioned in the local newspaper The News,  she shared her experience with the fans, saying “I have just got the coronavirus vaccine. I want to tell everyone it’s not painful at all”. Her funeral prayers were held on Friday, in the area of North Nazimabad in Karachi.

Filmography

Television

Cinema

References

External links

1941 births
2021 deaths
Pakistani radio writers
Pakistani screenwriters
Pakistani television writers
Women screenwriters
Women television writers
People from Kanpur
Muhajir people
Pakistani dramatists and playwrights
University of Karachi alumni
20th-century Pakistani women writers
PTV Award winners
20th-century Pakistani writers
21st-century Pakistani women writers
Recipients of the Pride of Performance
Writers from Karachi
Women radio writers
20th-century screenwriters
21st-century screenwriters